Joel Crisman (born February 3, 1971) is a former American football guard/American football center. He played in nine games for the Tampa Bay Buccaneers in 1996. He signed with the Bucs as a rookie free agent out of USC in 1994. Crisman spent most of 1994 and 1995 on the club's injured list and practice squad.

References

1971 births
Living people
American football offensive guards
USC Trojans football players
Tampa Bay Buccaneers players